This is a defunct women's tennis tournament on the WTA Tour that was held just once, in 1995. It was held in Nagoya, Japan from September 11 to September 17 and was a Tier IV event.  The official name of the tournament was the TVA Cup Ladies Open.

Finals

Singles

Doubles

See also
List of tennis tournaments

External links

Defunct tennis tournaments in Japan
Nagoya
Sports competitions in Nagoya